Victor "Vic" Rauter (born 1955) is a Canadian sportscaster for TSN, having joined the network in 1985. Rauter has anchored TSN's curling coverage for more than 25 years, providing play-by-play curling commentary for the Season of Champions on TSN, including events such as the Tim Hortons Brier, Scotties Tournament of Hearts, and the World Curling Championships. He lives in Orillia, Ontario.

Broadcasting career
Before joining TSN, Rauter was a sportscaster at the Canadian Broadcasting Corporation in Toronto covering the Olympic Games. He also worked for CFTR radio in Toronto as a news and sports reader before joining the Global Television Network in Toronto for four years.

Known as “the voice of curling” in Canada, Rauter currently provides play-by-play curling commentary for the Season of Champions on TSN, including events such as the Tim Hortons Brier, Scotties Tournament of Hearts, and the World Curling Championships. In addition to his curling coverage for TSN, Rauter has covered auto racing and soccer since 1986 as well as hockey, baseball, bowling, squash, volleyball, cycling, rugby, equestrian, and skiing. He was the first host for the CFL on TSN from 1987 to 1991.

Rauter handled curling play-by-play duties for Canada's Olympic Broadcast Media Consortium during the Vancouver 2010 Olympic Winter Games.

Rauter's best-known catch phrases are "Make the final..." with the final score at the end of a game, and "Count 'em up—1, 2, 3, 4..." [or more] after the last stone of an end scoring three or more.

Awards
In 1999, Rauter was nominated for a Gemini Award as Canada's top sportscaster. In 2018, he was nominated for a Canadian Screen Award as Best Sports Play-by-Play Announcer.

In 2006, Rauter was inducted into the Canadian Curling Hall of Fame.

References

External links
 TSN biography of Vic Rauter

1955 births
Canadian television sportscasters
Canadian soccer commentators
Canadian colour commentators
Curling broadcasters
Canadian Football League announcers
Canadian people of Swiss-German descent
Bowling broadcasters
Living people
Major League Baseball broadcasters
Motorsport announcers
National Hockey League broadcasters
Olympic Games broadcasters
North American Soccer League (1968–1984) commentators
People from Orillia